Oidanothrips is a genus of thrips in the family Phlaeothripidae.

Species
 Oidanothrips enormis
 Oidanothrips frontalis
 Oidanothrips magnus
 Oidanothrips malayensis
 Oidanothrips maxillatus
 Oidanothrips megacephalus
 Oidanothrips moundi
 Oidanothrips nigripes
 Oidanothrips sumatrensis
 Oidanothrips taiwanus
 Oidanothrips takasago

References

Phlaeothripidae
Thrips
Thrips genera